George Turner Livingstone (5 May 1876 – 15 January 1950) was a Scottish footballer. He played for several prominent clubs for a few years apiece, including Heart of Midlothian, Celtic and Rangers in Scotland, and Sunderland, Liverpool, Manchester City and Manchester United in England. Livingstone was capped twice for the Scotland national team; his regular position was at inside forward.

Career
Livingstone was born in Dumbarton and started his career with local team Sinclair Swifts. He then moved to Artizan Thistle and Parkhead, before moving to Heart of Midlothian in the Scottish Football League, being part of the squad that won the competition in his first season, 1896–97, though he only played in four of the matches. He made 59 SFL and Scottish Cup appearances for the Edinburgh club, with 29 goals scored. In 1900, he joined Sunderland, but he only played there for a season (making 31 Football League and FA Cup appearances and scoring 12 goals – the club were league runners-up) before moving to Celtic, where in his one season he made 23 SFL and Scottish Cup appearances and scored seven goals as they finished as runners-up in both the league and cup.

In 1902, he moved back to England, signing for Liverpool (32 appearances, four goals) and then switched to Manchester City in 1903. He made 88 appearances for City, scoring 20 goals as the club won the 1904 FA Cup Final and were runners-up in the League in the same season. 

He returned to Scotland in 1906, playing for Rangers for two seasons and part of a third without winning a major trophy (53 appearances, 23 goals) before transferring to Manchester United in early 1909. He helped United win the 1910–11 Football League title (10 appearances in that campaign, from 46 and 3 goals overall) before retiring in 1914. 

He later served as manager of hometown club Dumbarton from early 1919 to late 1920 (also making one final league appearance as a player) and worked under Bill Struth at Rangers as the first team trainer.

He is the only footballer to date that has played (and scored) for both sides of the Old Firm and for Manchester's two biggest rivals.

Personal life
Livingstone's older brother Archie was also a professional footballer. He served as a private in the Royal Army Medical Corps during the First World War.

Honours
Manchester City
FA Cup: 1903–04

Manchester United
Football League First Division: 1910–11

See also
List of Scottish football families 
Played for Celtic and Rangers

References

External links 

1876 births
1950 deaths
Scotland international footballers
Scottish footballers
Heart of Midlothian F.C. players
Sunderland A.F.C. players
Celtic F.C. players
Liverpool F.C. players
Manchester City F.C. players
Rangers F.C. players
Manchester United F.C. players
Scottish football managers
Manchester United F.C. non-playing staff
Dumbarton F.C. managers
Rangers F.C. non-playing staff
Bradford City A.F.C. non-playing staff
Scottish Football League representative players
Parkhead F.C. players
Dumbarton F.C. players
Scottish Football League managers
Association football wing halves
Association football inside forwards
Association football coaches
Association football player-managers
British Army personnel of World War I
Royal Army Medical Corps soldiers
Sportspeople from Dumbarton
Footballers from West Dunbartonshire
Scottish Junior Football Association players
FA Cup Final players